Catello Amarante (born 1 May 1990) is an Italian rower, who won the gold medal at the 2013 World Rowing Championships in the men's lightweight eight.

Catello Amarante II is an athlete of the Gruppo Sportivo della Marina Militare.

Biography
He is called Catello Amarante II for better distinguish him from his cousin Catello Amarante I. He won a medal at the 2019 World Rowing Championships.

Achievements

References

External links

1990 births
Living people
Italian male rowers
World Rowing Championships medalists for Italy
People from Castellammare di Stabia
Rowers of Marina Militare
Sportspeople from the Province of Naples